The UNBC Timberwolves are the athletic teams that represent the University of Northern British Columbia in Prince George, British Columbia and currently compete in the Canada West conference of U Sports. The Timberwolves field varsity teams in basketball and soccer.

History
The Timberwolves were members of the Canadian Collegiate Athletic Association (CCAA), primarily competing in the Pacific Western Athletic Association (PacWest) until the 2011-12 season. In 2011, however, they were granted probationary membership for the 2012-2013 season by the Canada West Universities Athletic Association (Canada West) of the then-named Canadian Interuniversity Sport. The program first admitted the men's and women's soccer teams, as well as the men's and women's basketball teams that season. In 2014, UNBC was granted full membership to Canada West and has continued to field the aforementioned four varsity programs.

Gallery

References

External links
Official website

University of Northern British Columbia
University and college sports clubs in Canada
U Sports teams